Lalit Mohan Tripura is an Indian politician and the former member of the Tripura Legislative Assembly for the two consecutive terms from 2008 to 2018. He has been a member of Communist Party of India (Marxist) since 1982. In the 2018 Tripura Assembly election he were defeated by the Indigenous Peoples Front of Tripura candidate Dhananjoy Tripura by the margin of 1,922 votes.

References

1958 births
Living people
Tripuri people
Tripura politicians
Communist Party of India (Marxist) politicians
Communist Party of India (Marxist) politicians from Tripura